Corinna Schmidt is a 1951 East German drama film directed by Arthur Pohl and starring Trude Hesterberg, Willy Kleinoschegg and Ingrid Rentsch. It is based on the novel Jenny Treibel by Theodor Fontane. A penniless young woman falls in love with a country house and becomes engaged to the young man who owns it, while his scheming family try to break up the match.

Cast
 Trude Hesterberg  ...  Jenny Treibel
  Willy Kleinoschegg ...  Kommerzienrat Treibel
  Ingrid Rentsch ...  Corinna Schmidt
  Joseph Noerden ...  Leopold Treibel
  Peter Podehl ...  Dr. Marcel Wedderkopp
  Hans Hessling ...  Professor Schmidt
  Erna Sellmer ...  Frau Schmolke
  Chiqui Jonas ...  Helene Treibel
  Edelweiß Malchin  ...  Hildegard Munk
  Egon Brosig  ...  Leutnant Vogelsang
  Hermann Lenschau  ...  Otto Treibel
  Erika Glässner  ...  Majorin von Ziegenhals
  Ellen Plessow  ...  Fräulein vom Bomst
  Fred Hülgerth  ...  Kammersänger Krola
  Aribert Grimmer  ...  Friedrich

References

External links

1951 films
1951 drama films
German drama films
East German films
1950s German-language films
Films based on works by Theodor Fontane
Films set in the 1870s
German black-and-white films
1950s German films